Bruno Zauli (18 December 1902 – 7 December 1963) was an Italian sports official, best known as president of the Italian Athletics Federation from 1946 to 1957.

Bruno Zauli was the ideator of the European Cup (athletics).

See also
Italian Athletics Federation
European Cup (athletics)

References

External links
Storia della Coppa Europa from FIDAL

1902 births
1963 deaths
Athletics (track and field) administrators
Sportspeople from Ancona